Clerks (retronym: Clerks: The Animated Series) is an American adult animated sitcom that was first broadcast on ABC in 2000. Based on Kevin Smith's 1994 comedy film of the same name, it was developed for television by Smith, Smith's producing partner Scott Mosier and former Seinfeld writer David Mandel with character designs by Stephen Silver, known for character designs in Disney's Kim Possible and Nickelodeon's Danny Phantom. It is the first television show to be set in Smith's View Askewniverse.

Six episodes of the show were produced; only two episodes aired before the show was cancelled by ABC.

Production 
Clerks: The Animated Series was produced by Miramax, View Askew Productions and Woltz International Pictures Corporation in association with Touchstone Television. In addition to being Disney's second adult animated series after fellow Touchstone Television production The PJs, it was also the first (and so far) only adult animated series produced by Walt Disney Television Animation, which ultimately went uncredited.

According to the commentary for the series premiere episode, Smith and Mosier first had the idea of the animated series in 1995. In that same commentary, Mosier claimed that they pitched the series to "every" network, including HBO, Fox, The WB, and several others. They were given a thirteen-episode order from UPN, but turned down the offer in order to be on a bigger channel like ABC, having been told that UPN would be off the air within a year.

On a DVD bonus feature, Smith revealed that they initially cast Alan Rickman as the voice of Leonardo Leonardo, so they decided to design the character after Hans Gruber from the film Die Hard (1988). Rickman disapproved of the design because he did not want to play the character again. ABC eventually turned him down anyway for budgetary reasons and recast the role with Alec Baldwin.

Broadcast history 
Only two episodes were broadcast on ABC in the year 2000 before the series was canceled. Several factors contributed to the cancellation, including low ratings, the show's not fitting in with ABC's other programming, unsuccessful test-screening to older audiences, and ABC's decision to air the shows out of order. ABC aired the fourth episode first, as opposed to the intended first episode, and then aired the second episode despite the fact that the second episode is the 'flashback' episode, and derives much of its humor from the fact that it flashes back to the first episode (as well as the beginning of that very episode) rather frequently.  Additionally, the second episode aired without the scene from "Flintstone's List", the fictional RST Video rental that spoofed Schindler's List.

All six episodes were released on DVD in 2001, marking one of the first occasions in which a short-lived TV series found success in this format. The DVD commentary features cast and crew who frequently cite their disagreements with the network over the show's development. The entire series was eventually aired on Comedy Central, with the unaired episodes airing for the first time on television on December 14, 2002. In 2006, digital Freeview channel ITV 4 in the UK, began broadcasting episodes late on Monday nights. Starting November 14, 2008, Cartoon Network's Adult Swim block aired the series on Friday nights. It also aired on the El Rey Network during their "Jay and Silent Bob Takeover Marathon."

Several scenes filmed for, but cut from, the film Jay & Silent Bob Strike Back (but included on the film's DVD release) contain metafictional moments when Randal makes references to the animated series, as well as its cancellation. On his DVD commentary for the film, Smith said the intent was to make the quick cancellation of the series a running gag.

Cast 
 Brian O'Halloran as Dante Hicks
 Jeff Anderson as Randal Graves
 Jason Mewes as Jay
 Kevin Smith as Silent Bob
 Alec Baldwin as Leonardo Leonardo
 Dan Etheridge as Mr. Plug
 Tara Strong as Giggling Girl
 Walt Flanagan as Fanboy
 Bryan Johnson as Steve-Dave Pulasti
 Charles Barkley as Himself
 Gilbert Gottfried as  Jerry Seinfeld and Patrick Swayze
 Kevin Michael Richardson as Narrator 
 James Woods as Major Blakava
 Michael Buffer as Himself
 Gwyneth Paltrow as Herself 
 Judge Reinhold as Honorable Judge Reinhold 
 Kenny Mayne as Himself
 Bryan Cranston as Various 
 Jeff Bennett as British Customer
 April Winchell as Bailiff 
 Phil LaMarr as Alex Foley 
 Lauren Tom as Various 
 Kerri Kinney-Silver as Mother/Muffin Lady  
 Brian Posehn as Albert/Man on Fire 
 Michael McKean as Professor Ram/Creepy Old Guy 
 Kath Soucie as Jay's Granddaughter/Angry Costumer/Starstruck Woman 
 Dana Gould as Guy in 80's Flashback 
 Kevin McDonald as Batman Fan/Freak 
 Paul Dini as George Lucas
 Frank Welker as Bill Clinton

Episodes

Future 
For several years following the series' cancellation, Smith announced plans to make an animated film. He revealed in a commentary on Episode 6 that it would go theatrical (with the hopes of winning the newly launched Academy Award for Best Animated Feature), but later made plans to go direct-to-video. The basic plot involved Dante and Randal making a movie about their lives at the Quick Stop, a reference to the production of the original film. In an interview, Smith expanded on the delays surrounding the film. Apparently, when the Weinsteins left Miramax, owned at the time by Disney, the split was not completely amicable. The rights to the Clerks television show were still owned by the Disney company, who as a result were reluctant to work with The Weinstein Company, throwing the future of Clerks: Sell Out into question. At the 2007 Cornell Q&A, Smith said due to the Miramax/Weinstein argument "you will see a Jay and Silent Bob cartoon before Clerks: Sell Out."

However, when Miramax was purchased by Filmyard Holdings in 2011, Smith revealed on Twitter that Miramax had contacted him for new projects, and the possibility of reviving the series came up. In October 2019, Smith announced that a repurposed version of the script for Sell Out would serve as the basis for the live-action Clerks III. In 2020, as a response to the COVID-19 pandemic, Smith teased about bringing the show back on Hulu.

Reception 
Clerks: The Animated Series was named the 98th best animated series by IGN, comparing it to Firefly due to its partial, out of sequence airing. They specifically praised the second episode for its parody of the old television staple of clip shows, by showing clips of the previous episode as well as clips from the episode itself.

In 2011, Complex included it on their list of "The 25 Most Underrated Animated TV Shows Of All Time".

Home media 
The series was released in a two-disc collector's edition DVD set called Clerks Uncensored. The "Uncensored" refers to the restoration of a second episode segment cut from broadcast, as well as an uncensored episode, introduced by Mewes and Smith, in character as Jay and Silent Bob. The DVD was given an R-rating by the Motion Picture Association of America for "some sexual humor".

References

External links 

 Test footage for Clerks: Sell Out, a rumored feature film of the animated series
 
 
 

2000 American television series debuts
2002 American television series endings
2000s American adult animated television series
2000s American sitcoms
2000s American workplace comedy television series
American adult animated comedy television series
American animated sitcoms
English-language television shows
American Broadcasting Company original programming
New Jersey culture
Animated television shows based on films
Television series by ABC Studios
Television series by Disney Television Animation
Television series by Miramax Television
Television series by View Askew Productions
Television shows set in New Jersey
View Askewniverse
Works by Kevin Smith
Television series created by Scott Mosier